Oleg Romanov (born 31 March 1970) is a Belarusian ice hockey player. He competed in the men's tournaments at the 1998 Winter Olympics and the 2002 Winter Olympics.

Career statistics

Regular season and playoffs

International

References

External links
 

1970 births
Living people
Soviet ice hockey players
Olympic ice hockey players of Belarus
Ice hockey players at the 1998 Winter Olympics
Ice hockey players at the 2002 Winter Olympics
Ice hockey people from Minsk